USNS Albert J. Myer (T-ARC-6) was the second of only two Maritime Commission type S3-S2-BP1  ships built for the US Army near the end of World War II intended to support Army Signal Corps communications cables. She is named for Brig. Gen. Albert J. Myer, the founder  of the Signal Corps. The other ship was the William H. G. Bullard, later USS Neptune, which Myer later joined in naval service.

The new ship was laid up in 1946 until reactivated by the Army in 1952 for service out of Seattle, Washington maintaining the Alaska Communications System that served civilian as well as military needs. USACS Albert J. Myer also saw service on other defense and civilian cables and supported the Navy's Project Caesar, the unclassified name for building and maintaining the Sound Surveillance System (SOSUS) that tracked Soviet submarines.

The ship was transferred on 13 June 1966 to the Navy for service as USNS Albert J. Myer (T-ARC-6) assigned to Project Caesar, though supporting other military systems on occasion. Albert J. Myer, along with sister ship Neptune, were the only ships in the Navy designed and built as cable ships. Unlike Neptune, which had been commissioned by the Navy, Albert J. Myer was never commissioned serving entirely as a civil service crewed ship under the Military Sea Transportation Service (MSTS)/Military Sealift Command (MSC). Both underwent modifications and a major rebuild in the early 1980s. Albert J. Myer was deactivated in 1994.

Construction 
Maritime Commission hull 2558 was laid down on 14 April 1945 by Pusey & Jones Corp. of Wilmington, Delaware as the yard's hull number 1109. Albert J. Myer was launched on 7 November 1945, and sponsored by Mrs. Grace Salisbury Ingles,  the wife of Major General Harry C. Ingles, commanding officer of the Army Signal Corps.

Function 
The ship's assignments were typically to transport, deploy, retrieve and repair submarine cables. In later Naval service functions specified were towing a cable plow, a large devices used to bury cable in coastal areas to protect it from damage from trawls and other hazards. Additional functions not directly related to cable work were towing acoustic projectors and conducting acoustic, hydrographic, and bathymetric surveys.

Career

U.S. Army
Since World War II ended some eight months before her completion,  the Albert J. Myer was delivered to the  Maritime Commission on 17 May 1946 and  placed in the National Defense Reserve Fleet, James River Group, Lee Hall, Virginia. The ship was again taken in by the US Army on 7 February 1952. The ship was reactivated at Baltimore, Maryland with a crew recruited from Seattle, Washington where the ship would be based and put into service as USACS Albert J. Myer operated by the U.S. Army Transportation Corps for the U.S. Army Signal Corps.

Albert J. Myer's primary mission at the time was maintenance of  the Alaska Communications System which handled both military and commercial traffic to Alaska. Two cables linking Port Angeles, Washington and Ketchikan, Alaska with forty-eight circuits were laid in 1956. The ship also worked on projects for the Air Force and the Navy, including substantial assignment to Project Caesar in support of the Sound Surveillance System. During 1957 the ship laid cable for the U.S. Air Force between Thule, Greenland and Baffin Island with a landing at Cape Dyer. The Cape Dyer landing, subject to damage by gounding icebergs, was bypassed by the ship in 1964.

In 1961 the ship laid communications cable connecting the Pacific islands of Kwajalein, Ennylabegan (one of the islands in the Kwajalein atoll), Gugeegue, Eniwetok and Roi-Namur supporting the Army's then Kwajalein Missile Range, now the Ronald Reagan Ballistic Missile Defense Test Site for Nike Zeus tests. The first phase was laying thirty miles  of entrenched cable connecting the islands in the Kwajalein group and then another fifty-five miles of coaxial ocean cable connecting Eniwetok and Roi-Namur to the Kwajalein network. The entrenched cable path had to be first cleared of World War II era ordinance and the trench prepared by Navy underwater demolition team.

To preserve communications the ship was also available for emergency repairs to commercial cables. For example, the cable ship repaired a break in the Cable and Wireless cable between Fanning Island and Bamfield, Vancouver Island, British Columbia that was a British around the world link. The only other cable ship available in the northwest Pacific was also an Army ship. Albert J. Myer laid the shore ends of the Hampden, Newfoundland terminus of CANTAT-1 (CANadian TransAtlantic Telephone cable).

During March and April 1964 the ship conducted an extensive, detailed magnetic survey for the U.S. Naval Oceanographic Office northeast of Hispanola.

U.S. Navy
The cable layer was returned to the Maritime Administration (MARAD), 13 June 1966, and simultaneously transferred to the Navy where she served as the cable repair ship operated by the Military Sea Transportation Service as USNS Albert J. Myer (T-ARC-6) permanently assigned to Project Caesar.

Only two of the four cable ships available for Project Caesar had been designed and built as cable ships, the others being conversions and lacking some critical features needed for cable operations. Albert J. Myer and Neptune were extensively modernized in 1980  by Bethlehem Steel in Baltimore, Maryland. This included new turbo-electric engines replacing two Skinner Uniflow Reciprocating Steam Engines and modern cable machinery. The two ships had been the last ships in the Navy to operate using reciprocating steam engines.

The ship performed cable repair duties all over the world until 1994, when she'd been in active service for nearly 42 years. During her career, she received a Meritorious Unit Commendation (1974), and four Navy E ribbons (1981, 1982, 1984, and 1985).

Albert J. Myer was deactivated in 1994 entering the James River Reserve Fleet at Lee Hall, Virginia on 31 March 1994. On 1 April 1998 the Navy transferred title to the Maritime Administration for disposal. The ship was dismantled and recycled by International Shipbreaking Ltd of Brownsville, TX  in 2005.

Footnotes

References 

 The Ships and Aircraft of the U.S. Fleet, Norman Polmar, Naval Institute Press, 13th edition, 1984.

External links
AT&T Tech Channel Archives: Link To the North  - U.S. Army Cable Ship Albert J. Myer laying Alaska cable  (video)
Twin screw cable ship, Albert J. Myer, built for U.S. Maritime Commission, on ways before launching
Launch of Cape Race, William H. G. Bullard and Albert J. Myer (video) Launchings are early in video.
Launching of Albert J. Myer
Trial trip of the cable ship, Albert J. Myer

 

Type S3-S2-BP ships of the United States Army
Cold War auxiliary ships of the United States
Ships built by Pusey and Jones
1945 ships
Neptune-class cable ships